Hisonotus nigricauda is a species of catfish in the family Loricariidae. It is native to South America, where it occurs in the basins of the Paraguay River and the Paraná River. It reaches 6 cm (2.4 inches) in total length.

References 

Otothyrinae
Species described in 1891